Robert Louis "Bobby" Svarc (born 8 February 1946) is an English former professional footballer who played as a forward.

Career
Svarc, born in Leicester, England, began his career at Leicester City, making 13 appearances, scoring two goals before moving to Lincoln City in 1968. He scored 16 goals in 45 appearances, and during this time scored 3 goals in 15 appearances on loan at Barrow. Svarc signed for non-league Boston United for £2,000 in 1971, and it seemed that his days as full professional were over. However, when his manager Jim Smith took over the reins at Colchester United, he insisted that he bring with him his star player for a transfer fee of £6,000. At Boston, he had scored 21 goals in 28 matches. Unfortunately, his first season at Colchester was marred by injury, but he soon became a crowd favourite there and their leading scorer. After the most consistently successful time of his career, Svarc followed Smith again, this time to Blackburn Rovers in 1975, becoming Rovers' top scorer in the 1976–77 season. He scored some great goals and probably would have got more but for a knee injury which curtailed his playing days. He also made a single appearance for Watford

Svarc's playing style depended on close control, quick turns, and sharp shooting. Not particularly tall, he was nevertheless a good header of the ball.

Outside football
After a career spent banging 'em in, Bobby then set about keeping 'em out and has been successfully achieving that ever since, for after scoring goals, he set up his own burglar alarm business in Blackburn and is still plying his trade in the town. Svarc is mentioned in the Half Man Half Biscuit song "Fear My Wraith" on the 1995 album Some Call It Godcore.

References

External links

Player Profile - Bobby Svarc

1946 births
Living people
Footballers from Leicester
English footballers
Association football forwards
Leicester City F.C. players
Lincoln City F.C. players
Barrow A.F.C. players
Boston United F.C. players
Colchester United F.C. players
Blackburn Rovers F.C. players
Watford F.C. players